Mean Girls: The Musical is an upcoming American musical film directed by Arturo Perez Jr. and Samantha Jayne and written by Tina Fey. It is an adaptation of the musical of the same name, which is also an adaptation of the 2004 film of the same name. It stars Angourie Rice, Reneé Rapp, Auli'i Cravalho, and Jaquel Spivey. 

Development began in January 2020 while filming commenced in March 2023. The film is set to be released on Paramount+.

Cast
 Angourie Rice as Cady Heron
 Reneé Rapp as Regina George
 Auliʻi Cravalho as Janis Sarkisian
 Jaquel Spivey as Damian Hubbard
 Bebe Wood as Gretchen Wieners
 Avantika Vandanapu as Karen Smith
 Christopher Briney as Aaron Samuels
 Tina Fey as Ms. Norbury 
 Tim Meadows as Principal Duvall
 Jenna Fischer as Ms. Heron
 Busy Philipps as Mrs. George

Production

Development 
In January 2020, Tina Fey announced that a film adaptation of the musical Mean Girls was in development. The musical itself is an adaptation of the 2004 film of the same name. In May 2021, Fey suggested to Variety that the cast members from the musical would likely not reprise their roles. In September 2021, Arturo Perez Jr. and Samantha Jayne signed on to direct. The film was produced by Paramount Players, Broadway Video and Little Stranger.

Casting
In December 2022, Angourie Rice, Reneé Rapp, Auliʻi Cravalho, and Jaquel Spivey were cast in the roles of Cady, Regina, Janis and Damian, respectively. In February 2023, it was reported that the roles of Aaron, Gretchen, and Karen would be played by Christopher Briney, Bebe Wood, and Avantika Vandanapu, respectively. Fey and Tim Meadows would reprise their roles from the film as Ms. Norbury and Principal Duvall, respectively. In February 2023, Jenna Fischer joined the cast as Ms. Heron, Cady Heron's mom. Busy Philipps portrays Mrs. George, Regina's mother. Additionally, Ashley Park, who played Gretchen in the original Broadway production, is set to make a cameo in the film.

Filming
Principal photography began in Middletown Township, New Jersey on March 7, 2023, with Bill Kirstein as cinematographer.

Music
Jeff Richmond will return to compose the score for the film adaptation, with lyrics written by Nell Benjamin.

Release
Mean Girls: The Musical is set to be released on Paramount+.

References

External links 
 

Upcoming films
American teen musical films
Films based on musicals based on films
Films produced by Lorne Michaels
Films shot in New Jersey
Films with screenplays by Tina Fey
Mean Girls (franchise)
Paramount+ original films
Paramount Pictures films
Paramount Players films
Upcoming directorial debut films
Upcoming English-language films